Bandon Grammar School is a Church of Ireland secondary school situated in Bandon, County Cork, Ireland. Established in 1642, it is one of the oldest schools in Ireland.

General 
Bandon Grammar School is a co-educational, boarding and day school founded in 1642, with an historic association with the Church of Ireland. It is managed by a local Board of Directors under the auspices of The Incorporated Society as patron and held from that body under a Lease "as a secondary school recognised as such by the Minister for Education under the rules of the Department of Education for secondary schools, primarily for Protestant pupils".

History 
Bandon Grammar School was founded in 1642 by Richard Boyle, 1st Earl of Cork.

Sport

Field hockey
With a team that included future Ireland men's field hockey internationals, David and Conor Harte, Bandon Grammar School won the 2005 All Ireland Schoolboys Hockey Championship.

Rugby
Bandon Grammar School competes in the Munster Schools 'A' competitions. Notable past players include Darren Sweetnam, James French, Gavin Coombes and Jack Crowley. Régis Sonnes spent two years coaching at the school, alongside coaching at Bandon R.F.C. Fiona Hayes currently coaches girls rugby at the school.

Notable past students 

 Gavin Coombes, Ireland and Munster Rugby player
 Conor Harte, Ireland field hockey international
 David Harte, Ireland field hockey international
 Graham Norton, TV chat show host and actor; finished his Leaving Certificate in 1981
 Lennox Robinson, playwright and director 
 Darren Sweetnam, Ireland and Munster Rugby player and former Cork senior hurler

References 

1641 establishments in Ireland
Bandon, County Cork
Private schools in the Republic of Ireland
Boarding schools in Ireland
Co-educational boarding schools
Educational institutions established in the 1640s
Secondary schools in County Cork
Anglican schools in the Republic of Ireland